Leukemia is a peer-reviewed medical journal published by the Nature Publishing Group. It was established in 1987 by Nicole Muller-Bérat Killman and Sven-Aage Killman, and is currently edited by Professors Andreas Hochhaus and Robert Peter Gale. The journal covers research on all aspects of leukemia.

Abstracting and indexing
The journal is abstracted and indexed in:

According to the Journal Citation Reports, the journal had a 2020 impact factor of 11.528. In the past, the journal has been accused of practicing coercive citation.

References

External links 
 

Oncology journals
Nature Research academic journals
Publications established in 1987
English-language journals
Monthly journals
Hematology journals